Amrudi (also Romanized as Āmrūdī; also known as Deh-e Namrūdī, Namrūdī, and Ramrūdī) is a village in Qorqori Rural District, Qorqori District, Hirmand County, Sistan and Baluchestan Province, Iran. At the 2006 census, its population was 154, in 31 families.

References 

Populated places in Hirmand County